The Ramo M600 is a .50 BMG, 12.7×108mm and 14.5×114mm bolt-action sniper rifle.

References

External links
 http://weapon.at.ua/snaiper_1/usa/m650-RAMO.jpg

Bolt-action rifles
12.7 mm sniper rifles